Harrislee is a municipality in the district of Schleswig-Flensburg, in Schleswig-Holstein, Germany. It is situated on the border with Denmark and directly beside Flensburg.

References

Denmark–Germany border crossings
Schleswig-Flensburg